was a Japanese peace and women's rights activist.

Early life 
Kushida was born in Yamaguchi prefecture on February 17, 1899. She briefly attended the Japan Women's University, but left school to marry , an economist. After his death in 1934, Kushida sold insurance and became a magazine reporter to support their two children.

Career 
After getting to know people like Yuriko Miyamoto, Shigeji Tsuboi, and Sakae Tsuboi in 1946, Kushida joined the Women's Democratic Club and became their first Secretary General. In 1958, Kushida was elected the president of the Federation of Japanese Women's Organizations.

In the 1990s, Kushida began protesting United States military bases in Japan. This was because of crimes committed by service members against Japanese women near the bases. She advocated for the removal of all foreign military bases, most notably in Okinawa. In 2000, Kushida led a march in Ginza protesting an agreement to increase military ties between Japan and the United States. She led the march from a wheelchair because of her age.

Selected bibliography

Reference 

1899 births
2001 deaths
Japanese activists
People from Yamaguchi Prefecture
Japanese feminists